The 2004–05 NBA season was the Mavericks' 25th season in the National Basketball Association. During the offseason, the Mavericks acquired Jason Terry from the Atlanta Hawks, and Jerry Stackhouse along with rookie Devin Harris from the Washington Wizards. The Mavericks got off to a fast start winning seven of their first eight games, holding a 35–16 record before the All-Star break. At midseason, the team acquired Keith Van Horn from the Milwaukee Bucks. However, on March 19, head coach Don Nelson stepped down and former Maverick Avery Johnson took over Nelson's duties for the remainder of the season. Under Johnson, the Mavericks won their final nine games of the season, finishing second in the Southwest Division with a 58–24 record, good for fourth place in the Western Conference. Dirk Nowitzki was selected for the 2005 NBA All-Star Game.

In the first round of the playoffs, the Mavericks lost the first two games against their in-state rival, the Houston Rockets, but managed to defeat them in seven games. The semi-finals against the top-seeded Phoenix Suns pitted Nowitzki against former teammate Steve Nash, who was named league MVP following the season. The Mavs would eventually lose the series in six games. Following the season, Michael Finley signed as a free agent with the San Antonio Spurs and Shawn Bradley retired.

For the season, the Mavs added an alternate green uniform, similar to the 1980s road uniform. They were designed by rapper Sean "P. Diddy" Combs and remained in used until 2009.

Draft picks

Roster

Roster Notes
 Center Shawn Bradley also holds American citizenship, but he played for the German national team and was born in Germany.
 Shooting guard Tariq Abdul-Wahad missed the entire season due to tendinitis in his left knee.

Regular season

Standings

Record vs. opponents

Game log

Playoffs

|- align="center" bgcolor="#ffcccc"
| 1
| April 23
| Houston
| L 86–98
| Dirk Nowitzki (21)
| Josh Howard (10)
| Nowitzki, Terry (3)
| American Airlines Center20,678
| 0–1
|- align="center" bgcolor="#ffcccc"
| 2
| April 25
| Houston
| L 111–113
| Dirk Nowitzki (26)
| Erick Dampier (9)
| Jason Terry (6)
| American Airlines Center20,884
| 0–2
|- align="center" bgcolor="#ccffcc"
| 3
| April 28
| @ Houston
| W 106–102
| Dirk Nowitzki (28)
| three players tied (6)
| Daniels, Terry (4)
| Toyota Center18,199
| 1–2
|- align="center" bgcolor="#ccffcc"
| 4
| April 30
| @ Houston
| W 97–93
| Jason Terry (32)
| Dirk Nowitzki (7)
| Dirk Nowitzki (6)
| Toyota Center18,211
| 2–2
|- align="center" bgcolor="#ccffcc"
| 5
| May 2
| Houston
| W 103–100
| Dirk Nowitzki (23)
| Dirk Nowitzki (13)
| Jason Terry (7)
| American Airlines Center20,894
| 3–2
|- align="center" bgcolor="#ffcccc"
| 6
| May 5
| @ Houston
| L 83–101
| Jerry Stackhouse (21)
| Dirk Nowitzki (13)
| Nowitzki, Terry (4)
| Toyota Center18,215
| 3–3
|- align="center" bgcolor="#ccffcc"
| 7
| May 7
| Houston
| W 116–76
| Jason Terry (31)
| Dirk Nowitzki (14)
| Armstrong, Stackhouse (4)
| American Airlines Center20,884
| 4–3
|-

|- align="center" bgcolor="#ffcccc"
| 1
| May 9
| @ Phoenix
| L 102–127
| Dirk Nowitzki (28)
| Dirk Nowitzki (13)
| Dirk Nowitzki (4)
| America West Arena18,422
| 0–1
|- align="center" bgcolor="#ccffcc"
| 2
| May 11
| @ Phoenix
| W 108–106
| Michael Finley (31)
| Dampier, Nowitzki (12)
| Finley, Stackhouse (5)
| America West Arena18,422
| 1–1
|- align="center" bgcolor="#ffcccc"
| 3
| May 13
| Phoenix
| L 102–119
| Dirk Nowitzki (21)
| Dirk Nowitzki (13)
| Jason Terry (7)
| American Airlines Center20,896
| 1–2
|- align="center" bgcolor="#ccffcc"
| 4
| May 15
| Phoenix
| W 119–109
| Josh Howard (29)
| Erick Dampier (11)
| Jason Terry (8)
| American Airlines Center20,894
| 2–2
|- align="center" bgcolor="#ffcccc"
| 5
| May 18
| @ Phoenix
| L 108–114
| Dirk Nowitzki (34)
| Erick Dampier (14)
| Jason Terry (8)
| America West Arena18,422
| 2–3
|- align="center" bgcolor="#ffcccc"
| 6
| May 20
| Phoenix
| L 126–130 (OT)
| Jason Terry (36)
| Josh Howard (14)
| Dirk Nowitzki (6)
| American Airlines Center20,915
| 2–4
|-

Player statistics

Season

Playoffs

Awards and records
 Dirk Nowitzki, All-NBA First Team
 Dirk Nowitzki, NBA All-Star Game

Transactions

References

External links

Dallas Mavericks seasons
Dallas
Dallas